Raga Malgunji is a Hindustani classical raga from the Khamaj Thaat. Some say it is a part of the Kafi Thaat too.

Theory
Malgunji is a mixture of Khamaj, Bageshree, Rageshwari, Vāgeshwari  and Jaijaiwanti ragas. Raga Malgunji is similar to Raag Bageshree but it employs Shuddha Gandhar in Aaroh which makes it different from Bageshree. Malgunji also has some elements of Raga Khamaj.This Raag employs Shuddha Gandhar in Aaroh and Komal Gandhar in Avroh. Raga Vachak notes of Raag Malgunji are S, D, N S R G m which are recurring. In Uttarang, Nishad Shuddha is occasionally rendered like m D N S. Shuddha Gāndhāra is a Prominent note. Vadi is Madhyama and Samavadi is Ṣaḍja. This Raga can be expanded in all the three octaves. This Raga creates a heavy atmosphere

Svaras

The Svaras in the raga are,

Panchama Varjyit in the Aaroh. Both Nishads, Both Gāndhāras. Rest all Shuddha Svaras.

Arohana & Avarohana

Arohana

S R G m D N S

Avarohana

S' n D P m G R G m g R S

Vadi & Samavadi

Vadi: Madhyama (Ma)

Samavadi: Ṣaḍja (Sa)

Pakad or Chalan

G m g R S n S D n S R G m

Relationships
Related ragas: Bageshree and Rageshree. Thaat: Khamaj

Behavior
Behavior refers to practical aspects of the music. In Hindustani music many of the concepts are fluid, changing, or archaic. The following information reflects how the music once existed.

The raga is generally performed during the hours form 3rd Prahar of the night. Some say that the time is 9am to 12 pm.

Certain ragas have seasonal associations.

References

2. Raag Malgunji - Indian Classical Music - Tanarang.com

External links
 SRA on Samay and Ragas
 SRA on Ragas and Thaats
 Rajan Parrikar on Ragas
 Rajan Parrikar on Bageshree & Malgunji

M